Sartaj Singh Pannu is an Indian filmmaker known for directing the multiple National Film Awards winning film Nanak Shah Fakir

Early life
Pannu was born in Punjab and was sent to study at St Georges’ College, Mussoorie.

Career
Pannu's debut film as a director and actor is Soch Lo, which also featured him as the lead actor,
His went on to make Nanak Shah Fakir, the first ever biopic on Guru Nanak. The film ran into controversies as it was the Shiromani Gurdwara Parbandhak Committee (SGPC) has expressed concerns against it.
He has since made the Punjabi film Tiger, starring Sippy Gill  and another Hindi language film, Om.

Filmography
Soch Lo (2010)
Nanak Shah Fakir (2015)
Tiger (2016) (Punjabi film)
Om (Hindi film)

References

External links
 

Hindi-language film directors
21st-century Indian film directors
Year of birth missing (living people)
Living people